Jadidat Al-Shatt Sport Club, is an Iraqi football team based in Diyala, that plays in Iraq Division Two.

Stadium
On March 2, 2022, the Ministry of Youth and Sports approved a project to rehabilitate the Jadidat Al-Shatt stadium, which will start working during the coming period.

Managerial history
 Sarmad Rasheed

See also 
 2021–22 Iraq FA Cup

References

External links
 Jadidat Al-Shatt SC on Goalzz.com
 Iraq Clubs- Foundation Dates

2004 establishments in Iraq
Association football clubs established in 2004
Football clubs in Diyala